ABPC may refer to:
Associated British Picture Corporation, a British film production, distribution and exhibition company active 1927–1970
Provincial Court of Alberta